Sad Street is an album by the American R&B musician Bobby "Blue" Bland. It was released in 1995.

The album was nominated for a Grammy Award, in the "Best Contemporary Blues Album" category. It peaked at No. 11 on the Billboard Blues Albums chart.

Production
The album was recorded with the Muscle Shoals house band; string arrangements were done in Miami, Florida. The title song was written by George Jackson, with many others provided by the songwriting partnership of Sam Mosley and Robert Johnson.

Critical reception

The Commercial Appeal opined that "Bland gets deep into the blues," writing that "'Double Trouble' deals with the age-old blues dilemma of dealing with a troublesome wife and girlfriend." The Tampa Tribune thought that the album "perfectly captures his wistful romanticism and raspy-smooth vocals." 

Texas Monthly concluded that Malaco's "synthesizer-and-strings approach has kept him contemporary without making him sound foolish." The San Antonio Express-News noted that "Sad Street find Bland still working a smooth, sophisticated, but unmistakably blues-driven, groove."

AllMusic wrote that "Malaco's well-oiled, violin-enriched studio sound fit Bland's laid-back contemporary approach just fine (even if his voice admittedly wasn't what it used to be)." MusicHound R&B: The Essential Album Guide agreed that Bland's voice was "a ravaged hulk by this point." The Sunday Times deemed it a "gritty" album that proved Bland's "Southern blues credentials."

Track listing

References

Bobby Bland albums
1995 albums